Monte Circeo or Cape Circeo is a mountain promontory that marks the southwestern limit of the former Pontine Marshes, located on the southwest coast of Italy near San Felice Circeo. The land to the northeast is the former ancient Pontine Marshes. Most of the ancient swamp has been reclaimed for agriculture and urban areas. 

The mountain, the coastal zone as far north as Latina, including the only remaining remnant of the swamp, and two of the Pontine Islands offshore, Zannone and Ponza, have been included in the Circeo National Park.

Geology

Although a headland, it was not formed by coastal erosion – as headlands are usually formed – but is a remnant of the orogenic processes that created the Apennines. The entire coast of Lazio, on which the mountain and the marsh are located, was a chain of barrier islands that was formed on a horst and made part of the mainland by sedimentation of the intervening graben.

The mountain is composed mostly of marl and sandstone from the Paleogene and of limestone from the lower Early Jurassic.

Prehistory

In 1939, the skull of a Neanderthal man was found in the Guattari Cave by a team led by Alberto Carlo Blanc. Several other findings also show that the mountain was inhabited in prehistorical times. In May 2021, the remains of 9 Neanderthal men were discovered in the same Guattari cave. The Minister of Culture in Italy declared the site to be one of the most significant in the world regarding the Neanderthal period.

History

Today

References

External links

 Holiday, sea, places to visit
 At the site of the Circeo National Park
 Hystory and Legends

Circeo
Circeo
Circeo
Landforms of the Tyrrhenian Sea
Biosphere reserves of Italy
Neanderthal sites
Horsts (geology)
Archaeological sites in Italy